Cubana de Aviación, the national carrier of Cuba, has been involved in 51 incidents and accidents between 1934 and 2018, 27 of which had 1 fatality or more, with 708 fatalities. Included are ground and collision fatalities and hijackings.

List

See also
List of Cuba–United States aircraft hijackings

Notes

References

External links
Cubana de Aviacion – Accidents and terrorism

 
accidents and incidents
Lists of aviation accidents and incidents